Pierre Henri Dorie (1839–1866) was a French missionary of the Paris Foreign Missions Society, who was martyred in Korea in 1866. His feast day is March 7, and he is also venerated along with the rest of the 103 Korean Martyrs on September 20.

Biography
Henri Dorie was born on 23 September 1839 in Saint-Hilaire-de-Talmont.

Following the arrest and execution of Bishop Siméon-François Berneux on 7 March 1866, all but three of the French missionaries in Korea were also captured and executed: among them were Bishop Antoine Daveluy, Father Just de Bretenières, Father Louis Beaulieu, Father Dorie, Father Pierre Aumaître, Father Martin-Luc Huin, all of them members of the Paris Foreign Missions Society.

The persecutions triggered the French Campaign against Korea in October–November 1866.

Like the other martyrs, Pierre Henri Dorie was canonized by Pope John Paul II on 6 May 1984 under the name Peter Henricus Dorie.

See also
France-Korea relations

Notes

References
 Les Missions Etrangères: Trois siècles et demi d'histoire et d'aventure en Asie. Editions Perrin (2008). .

Bibliography
The Lives of the 103 Martyr Saints of Korea 38: Saint Pierre Henri Dorie, Priest (1839-1866), Catholic Bishops' Conference of Korea Newsletter No. 51 (Summer 2005).

External links
 Archives of the Paris Foreign Missions Society

1839 births
1866 deaths
People from Vendée
Paris Foreign Missions Society missionaries
Martyred Roman Catholic priests
19th-century French Roman Catholic priests
French Roman Catholic saints
19th-century Roman Catholic martyrs
19th-century Christian saints
19th-century executions by Korea
French people executed abroad
Executed people from Pays de la Loire
Roman Catholic missionaries in Korea
French expatriates in Korea